Take This to Heart Records, sometimes abbreviated as TTTH or T3H, is an American independent record label.

Overview 
Take This to Heart Records was founded by Joe Urban in Boston, Massachusetts in 2014. Prior to founding the label, Urban toured with bands and worked at Zing Recording Studios in Westfield, Massachusetts; it was at Zing where he was inspired to start a label for smaller artists. The name came from a brainstorming session where Urban reportedly said, "I really want people to take these records to heart." Urban drew influence from labels like Saddle Creek, Vagrant, Drive-Thru, and Asian Man Records. Since January 2017, the label has had a distribution deal with Alternative Distribution Alliance, a subsidiary of Warner Music Group.

The label has released records by artists including Bent Knee, The Higher, McCafferty, Save Face, Jetty Bones, and Super American. Their roster includes artists in alternative rock, punk rock, post-hardcore, pop rock, power pop, and emo.

In 2022, the label released the compilation album A Monument To Commemorate Our Time: A Tribute To Lifted by Bright Eyes, a collection of covers from the band Bright Eyes' album Lifted or The Story Is in the Soil, Keep Your Ear to the Ground. Contributors to the album included John-Allison Weiss, Dan Campbell of The Wonder Years, Rat Tally, Riverby, and Sarah and the Safe Word, and proceeds were donated to the National Multiple Sclerosis Society.

Artists

Current 
 Baby Fuzz
 Bad Luck.
 Barely Civil
 Bent Knee
 City Mouth
 Future Teens
 Girl K
 The Higher
 Kali Masi
 Lilith
 M.A.G.S.
 ManDancing
 Marigold
 Palette Knife
 PONY
 Riverby
 Sarah and the Safe Word
 Snarls
 The Sonder Bombs
 Super American
 Telethon
 Thanks! I Hate It

Alumni 

 Arrows Over Athens
 Cheer Up
 Dead Leaves
 Fossil Youth
 Hodera
 Home Movies
 Jetty Bones
 McCafferty
 Ness Lake
 No Tide
 The Other Stars
 Rat Kid Cool
 Save Face
 Sundressed
 Swordfish
 Traditions
 Tranquility
 Western Daughter

References

External links 

 
 Take This to Heart Records on Bandcamp
 Interview with Joe Urban on the Celebrity Punk House podcast
 Interview with Joe Urban on the Starting a Record Label podcast

American independent record labels
Record labels established in 2014
Record labels based in Massachusetts
2014 establishments in Massachusetts